(1892–1970) was a nihonga artist in Taishō and Shōwa Japan.

Life
Married in 1921, she moved to Manchuria in 1927, returning to Japan at the end of the war.

Works
Her 1918 self-portrait  features a facial bruise which she wrote symbolizes the many abuses routinely inflicted upon women by men and the backdrop of an unfinished painting. It is one of three of her works designated as Municipal Cultural Properties of Osaka. This work and two others by the artist, Blackened Teeth (1920) and Woman (Passion of Black Hair) (1917) were shown in Tokyo in 2021 as part of an exhibition at the National Museum of Modern Art, Tokyo titled “Ayashii: Decadent and Grotesque Images of Beauty in Modern Japanese Art.”

See also
 List of Cultural Properties of Japan - paintings (Ōsaka)
 Uemura Shōen
 Yamashita Rin

References

1892 births
1970 deaths
20th-century Japanese painters
20th-century Japanese women artists
People from Sakai, Osaka
Nihonga painters